Jack Chapple (July 23, 1943 – October 19, 1979) was an American football linebacker. He played for the San Francisco 49ers in 1965.

References

1943 births
1979 deaths
American football linebackers
Stanford Cardinal football players
San Francisco 49ers players